Concepción District may refer to:

Paraguay
 Concepción, Paraguay

Peru
 Concepción District, Concepción, in Concepción province, Junín region
 Concepción District, Vilcas Huamán, in Vilcas Huamán province, Ayacucho region

Costa Rica
 Concepción District, Alajuelita, in Alajuelita, San José province
 Concepción District, Atenas, in Atenas, Alajuela province
 Concepción District, La Unión, in La Unión, Cartago province
 Concepción District, San Isidro, in San Isidro, Heredia province
 Concepción District, San Rafael, in San Rafael, Heredia province
 Concepción District, San Ramón, in San Ramón, Alajuela province